The Zotye Z700 is a full-size sedan produced by Chinese auto maker Zotye Auto. It is considered the brand's flagship sedan.

Overview

The Zotye Z700 debuted at the 2015 Shanghai Auto Show and was positioned above the Zotye Z500 mid-size sedan. During the development phase of the Zotye Z700, the full-size sedan was actually called the Zotye Z600.

Power comes from a 1.8L turbo through a 5-speed manual or 6-speed DCT powering the front wheels. The Zotye Z700 is available to the Chinese market in 2015 with prices ranging from 105,800 yuan to 165,800 yuan.

Design
The vehicle has most of its design based on the Audi A6.

Zotye Z700H
The Zotye Z700H is the 2018 facelift version of the Zotye Z700 sedan featuring subtle interior and exterior styling details update. In spite of its cheap price, the interior of this sedan is equipped with a sound system that only built for luxury cars.

References

External links 

Zotye official website

Z500
Cars introduced in 2015
2010s cars
Cars of China
Full-size vehicles
Front-wheel-drive vehicles
Sedans